Gastroduodenostomy is a surgical procedure where the doctor creates a new connection between the stomach and the duodenum. This procedure may be performed in cases of stomach cancer or in the case of a malfunctioning pyloric valve.

See also 
 List of surgeries by type

References

Digestive system surgery